Drenthe University of Applied Sciences (Dutch: Hogeschool Drenthe) is a former vocational university in the Netherlands. Located in the province of Drenthe, its departments were scattered across the cities of Assen, Emmen, and Meppel. Since 2008, it is merged with CHN University of Applied Sciences (Christelijke Hogeschool Nederland) to Stenden University of Applied Sciences.

NHL Stenden University of Applied Sciences
Organisations based in Drenthe
History of Drenthe

de:Hogeschool Drenthe
nl:Stenden hogeschool
zh:史坦德專業大學